Mohammad Ali Bannout (محمد علي بنوت; born 17 December 1976, in Beirut, Lebanon), informally referred to as Moe Bannout, is a Lebanese IFBB professional bodybuilder.

Competitive statistics
Age:  
Height: 1.78 m
Competitive weight: 108 kg 
Off Competitive weight : 120 kg

Competitive history
 2002, The Hero of Heroes of Lebanon
 2003, The Hero of Heroes of Lebanon
 2004, The Hero of Heroes of Lebanon
 2005, The Hero of Heroes of Lebanon
 2005, Arab Bodybuilding Championship, Jordan, 5th
 2006, Arab Bodybuilding Championship, Jordan
 2007, IFBB World Amateur Bodybuilding Championships, Light Heavyweight, 3rd
 2009, IFBB Ironman Pro Invitational, 7th
 2010, IFBB Phoenix Pro, Open, 10th
 2014, IFBB Phoenix Pro, Open, 1st
 2015, IFBB Mr Olympia, Open, 16th

See also
 IFBB Professional League
 List of male professional bodybuilders

External links 
 Gallery at bodybuilding.com
 2007 IFBB World Amateur Championships gallery
 2007 IFBB World Amateur Championships, list of participants
 2009 IFBB Ironman Pro Invitational, list of participants

References

1976 births
Lebanese bodybuilders
Male bodybuilders
Living people
Professional bodybuilders
Sportspeople from Beirut